Joseph Cowen, Jr., (9 July 1829 – 18 February 1900) was an English radical Liberal politician and journalist. He was a firm friend to Anglo-Jewry, and an early advocate of Jewish emancipation, regularly contributing to The Jewish Chronicle.

Early life 
The son of Joseph Cowen, Snr, a prominent citizen and Member of Parliament (MP) for Newcastle upon Tyne from 1874 to 1886, was born at Stella Hall, Blaydon (demolished 1953). Cowen junior was educated privately in Ryton and at the University of Edinburgh where he interested himself in European revolutionary movements. Cowen then joined his father in his Blaydon brick business, smuggling documents abroad in the consignments of bricks. Cowen numbered among his friends Mazzini, Louis Blanc and Ledru-Rollin, as well as Herzen and Bakunin. Garibaldi, Felice Orsini and Lajos Kossuth came to visit him in Blaydon. He supported the miners and improved the lot of the working-classes. One area of improvement revisited again by Cowen was education: changes to the Mechanics Working-men institute, was followed by a public library for Newcastle.

Political career 
In 1874, he was elected Member of Parliament, succeeding his father, who had held the Newcastle seat as a Liberal since 1865.

A radical on domestic questions when elected, Cowen was also a sympathizer with Irish Nationalism, In speech, dress and manner he identified himself with the coal miners of North East England. According to Dilke he spoke with a distinctive Tyneside burr. To the consternation of Liberal operatives, Cowen vigorously supported Disraeli's foreign policy, and in 1881 opposed the Gladstonian settlement with the Boers.

On 13 July 1876, he joined John Bright in introducing Joseph Chamberlain into the Commons as the new MP for Birmingham.

Short in stature and uncouth in appearance, his individuality first shocked and then by its earnestness impressed the House of Commons; and his sturdy independence of party ties, combined with a gift of rough but genuine eloquence (of which his speech on the Royal Title Bill of 1876 was an example), rapidly made him one of the best-known public men in the country.

His independence (which his detractors attributed in some degree to his alleged susceptibility to Tory compliments) brought him into collision both with the Liberal parliamentary party and with the party organization in Newcastle itself, but Cowen's personal popularity and his remarkable powers as an orator triumphed in his own birthplace, and he was again elected in 1885.

Shortly afterwards, however, the 'Blaydon Brick' retired both from parliament and from public life in 1886, professing his disgust at the party intrigues of politics, and devoted himself to conducting his newspaper, the Newcastle Daily Chronicle, and to his private business. In this capacity he exercised a wide influence on local opinion, and the revolt of the Newcastle electorate in later years against "doctrinaire Radicalism" was largely due to his constant preaching of a broader outlook on national affairs. He served as President of the first day of the 1873 Co-operative Congress.

Behind the scenes he continued to play a powerful part in forming North-country opinion until his death. His letters were published by his daughter in 1909.

A fine bronze statue of Cowen stands in Westgate Road in Newcastle upon Tyne.

His name lives on in The Joseph Cowen Lifelong Learning Centre, a Charitable Incorporated Organisation also based in Newcastle upon Tyne, delivering the 'Explore' lecture programme.

References

Bibliography 
 
  Copies in Manchester University, Newcastle Central and Gateshead libraries.

External links 

peerage.com
Joseph Cowen's pamphlet collection at JSTOR
Catalogue entry to the Joseph Cowen papers at Tyne & Wear Archives & Museums
Joseph Cowen: Geordie Entrepreneur, Politician and Radical

1829 births
1900 deaths
Members of the Parliament of the United Kingdom for English constituencies
UK MPs 1874–1880
UK MPs 1880–1885
UK MPs 1885–1886
Presidents of Co-operative Congress